Jim Poynter (born October 13, 1943) is an American set decorator. He was nominated for an Academy Award in the category Best Art Direction for the film The Right Stuff.

Selected filmography
 The Right Stuff (1983)

References

External links
 
 

1943 births
Living people
American set decorators
People from San Francisco